Nathalie Balsan-Duverneuil, aka Nath-Sakura (born November 21, 1973 in Girona) is a Catalan-Spanish photographer. She is of unknown parentage and was raised in an orphanage. She became a photographer because "she couldn’t paint", as she explained to Art Nou, the Catalan art magazine.

Biography 
Nath-Sakura graduated with a PhD in Philosophy from the University of Montpellier. She then took up a career as a professional reporter. Her identity as a trans woman plays a large role in her work, which often narrates her own transition and those of others. Her work is mostly about the "movement between genders and aims to show with great subtlety the 'metaphysical brutality' in being born again."

She now lives in the south of France, near Montpellier, and works for many non-specialized daily and weekly newspapers as a photo reporter. To date she has published five photography books and appeared in many exhibitions. She is one of the associated artists of the Bertold Foundation in Lugano, Switzerland and is both a photo reporter and an art photographer.

Exhibitions

2004

 Museu d'Art Contemporani Art de Barcelona, Catalonia, Spain
 II Prague, Czech Republic. 
 Reporting from Gaza, Palestine, children of mixed couples (Israelis / Palestinians).

2005

 Exhibition "Art in prison," Villeneuve-les-Maguelone. 
 Exhibition in the Saint-Sulpice church, Montpellier, France. 
 Prize winner of the photojournalism festival in Melbourne, Australia.

2006

 Photographic artbook "Powers" (Map editor). 
 Exhibition at the Tavern of Chaos, Paris, France. 
 Gallery Albertini, Dijon, France. Exhibition and artist associated with Bertold Foundation, Lugano, Switzerland. 
 Gallery Què Pasa, Vigo, Spain. 
 Gallery W & V, Berlin, Germany.

2007

 Photographic Collection "duality" (LDP editor). 
 Tarot of Eve and / Tarot nathcsf2007.jpg Lilith , exposed in Alet-les-Bains and Marseille, France. 
  Vauban National Exhibition, National Maritime Museum in Toulon, France.  Museum exhibition - La Seyne-sur-Mer. 
 Arte Lisboa, Lisbon, Portugal.

2008
 Exhibition "Contradictory", Le Divan du Monde, Paris, France. 
 Photographic collection "Pervy Obsessions" (Ragage). 
 Exhibition Tate Gallery, Liverpool, United Kingdom. 
 Restaurant Sketch Exhibition, London, United Kingdom. 
 Exhibition at Teatro Fernán Gómez, Plaza de Colón, Madrid.

2009

 Reports and photographic illustrations "A woman, two men, three eyes (Ragage editor).
 Panelist Assises du Corps Transformé (Assizes of the Body Transformed), Faculty of Law of Montpellier. 
 Exhibition "To finish once and for all with photography ," 
 In my gallery, your home, Nîmes, France.

2010

 Exhibition "Everything Lust go" Backstage Gallery, Marseille, France.

2011
 
 Exhibition "Ergo sum", The Showcase Gallery, Arles, France (February). 
 Exhibition "icon (s) vs Lilith Eve," MUSEAAV, Nice, France (March). 
 Exhibition "Between them," Concord Art Gallery, Paris, France (April). 
 Sponsor of the Festival "313730.php Supernova" in Montpellier, France (May). 
 Exhibition "Res Cogitans" in Chai du Terral Saint-Jean-de-Vedas (Hérault) in May. 
 Gallery Hoche, Versailles, France, June.

2013

 Exhibition Corpus Delicti
 lecture on her photojournalism work
 International Exhibition of Photography of Riedisheim (France)

2013

 Exhibition "Corpus Delicti"
 Conference on his photo-journalism work at the Salon international de la photographie de Riedisheim

2014

 Exhibition in Hollywood at the Artist's Corner Gallery & Bookmaking in the 23° PhotoLA (Los Angeles). 
 Exhibition in Hong-Kong, in the Asia Contemporary Art Show by Paris Art Limited gallery. 
 Exhibition in Rennes (France), at the Eleven gallery

2015

 Lecturer at the International meetings on professional photography in Montpellier (France)

Bibliography 
 Pouvoirs, (Powers), éditions Map, 2005
 Dualités, (Dualities), LP, 2006
 Vauban à Toulon, l'arsenal et la rade, (Vauban in Toulon, the Arsenal and the Harbor), Musée national de la marine, 2007
 Pervy Obsessions, photographic collection, preamble by Robert Chouraqui, Thomas Ragage editpr, Neuilly, 2008
 1 femme, 2 hommes, 3 regards, (One Woman, Two Men, Three Looks), with Fabrizio Pasini and Nalair, preamble by Patrick Wecksteen, Thomas Ragage editor, Neuilly 2009
 Fatales, (Fatal), texts by Jean-Paul Gavard-Perret, preamble by Christophe Mourthé, Victoria Editions, Montpellier, 2012
 Eternelles, (Eternal), texts by Eugène Durif, Victoria Editions, Montpellier, 2014

References

External links 
 Official portfolio
 Official website
 Nath-Sakura books in French
 Article on Nath-Sakura in El Païs 
 Article on Nath-Sakura in Midi Libre
 Article on Nath-Sakura in La Gazette de Montpellier
 Report on the French TV Canal +

1973 births
Living people
Artists from Catalonia
Journalists from Catalonia
Spanish LGBT journalists
People from Girona
Spanish women journalists
Spanish women photographers
Transgender journalists
Transgender photographers
Transgender women
Spanish LGBT photographers